San Mateo National High School (SMNHS) is a government-funded secondary educational institution located in the Municipality of San Mateo, Rizal in the Philippines.

History
The school was established in 1985 through the leadership of the former Municipal Mayor Nemesio Roxas.

The school started with 90 first year students with only 5 teachers through the approval of a temporary permit #73. Soon, the exceedingly large number of enrollees in the next school year, 1986–87 paved the way for the hiring of more teachers and non-teaching personnel. Initially, Crisanto Rivera acted as the Officer-in-Charge. Upon his exit in 1986, Leticia A. Bautista took office for two consecutive years until 1988.

San Mateo Municipal High School was converted to a National High School under the management of Juana M. Garrovillas who served as the principal from 1988 to 2000. Apparently within her term, she was able to transpire physical improvements of the school facilities to meet the demands of the growing population. Makeshifts and 2 Ynares buildings were constructed through her consistent follow up at the municipal and provincial offices. Until then, Computer Room, Science Building, H.E. Room and Library were made possible for quality service.

The first annex was established in 1994 pursuant to R.A. # 6655 addressing the growing need of the barangay for a public school in Barangay Silangan, San Mateo, Rizal. The annex started with one section of first year. When the AFP Retirement and Separation Benefit System granted the deed of donation on March 22, 1997, providing their own school site, Silangan Annex was separated from the main. It was therefore renamed, Silangan National High School under the leadership of Remigio Olesco as the former Teacher-in-Charge and presently managed by Ricardo C. Vergara, Principal I. Later, another annex was founded, the Sto. Niño Annex which was headed by Carmelita G. Olesco followed by Flora V. Caron as TIC's, to address the growing population of Barangay Sto. Niño. In 2006, this annex was declared as an Independent School, presently known as Sto. Niño National High School.

Last January 2014, Vidal F. Mendoza was replaced by Juana M. Garrovillas Principal IV of Francisco P. Felix Memorial National High School in order to come back in her Home School served for more than 13 years. And to plan in her retirement in July 2015, In her administration, 2 Department Chairmen were promoted to principals. In January 2014, Mila N. Ramirez, Chairman of Mathematics Department was promoted to Principal in Guinayang Annex National High School. In 2015 Anagine E. Sindac, Chairman of Filipino Department was promoted to Principal of Pintong Bukawe National High School. Their occupied positions in the department were occupied by Lorna Naval in Mathematics and Erlinda C. Lariego in Filipino.
In July 2015, on her 65th Birthday, Juana M. Garrovillas announced in her retirement from service, in the same month, Absalon Fernandez occupied the position of Juana M. Garrovillas as the principal.

Special Science curriculum

In School Year 2014-2015 San Mateo National High School commenced the Special Science curriculum to the K–12 Basic Education Curriculum.

Past and Present Administrators
 Dr. Elvira R. Conese - 2021–Present
 Mr. Absalon C. Fernandez - 2015–2021
 Ms. Juana M. Garrovillas - 2014–2015
 Dr. Vidal F. Mendoza - 2007–2014
 Mrs. Remedios C. Gervacio - 2000–2007
 Mrs. Corazon Laserna - 2000
 Ms. Juana M. Garrovillas - 1988–2000
 Mrs. Leticia Bautista - 1987–1988
 Dr. Crisanto Rivera - 1986–1987

Notable alumni
 Jerwin Gaco, PBA Basketball Player, notably in San Mig Coffee Mixers

See also 
 Education in the Philippines

References

External links
 Philippines Department of Education

High schools in Rizal
Education in San Mateo, Rizal
Educational institutions established in 1985
1985 establishments in the Philippines